Claudia Wess (born 15 June 1995) is an Austrian handball player for Hypo Niederösterreich and the Austrian national team.

Referencer 

1995 births
Living people
Austrian female handball players